is a Japanese manga series by Rin Asano. It has been serialized in Kadokawa Shoten's seinen manga magazine Young Ace since May 2016 and has been collected in thirteen tankōbon volumes. An anime television series adaptation by Encourage Films aired from April to June 2022.

Plot
The series is set in a Kyoto wagashi store. The protagonist is an only son, Nagomu Irino, who has dreams of becoming a member of a band, and ran away from home to live in Tokyo ten years ago. He receives a letter from home stating his father is in the hospital and asking him to take over the family shop, so he gives up on his dream and returns home.

While he's been gone, however, a ten-year-old girl named Itsuka Yukihira has started working in the shop. Nagomu's mom, having become a foster mom to Itsuka during the time that Nagomu was seeking his dream as a band member, declares that there will be a contest between Itsuka and Nagomu to see who will take over the family shop.

Characters

The protagonist. After graduating from college, Nagomu left —the family wagashi store—in order to pursue his dream of becoming a musician in Tokyo. When his father was hospitalized ten years after he left, Nagomu returned home to work in the family store.

A hardworking girl who lives at Nagomu's parents' home. Ten years old at the beginning of the story. She has been living in the Irino home for the past year, receiving room and board for helping out in the store. Nagomu's father wants her to inherit the store, and she's declared she won't lose the shop to Nagomu, the rightful heir to the store.

Nagomu's father. The owner of Ryokushō.

Nagomu's mother. 

Itsuka's mother.

Itsuka's father.

Nagomu's grandmother.

Nagomu's deceased grandfather.

Media

Manga
Deaimon is written and illustrated by Rin Asano. It began serialization in Kadokawa Shoten's seinen manga magazine Young Ace in May 2016 and has been collected in thirteen tankōbon volumes from Kadokawa Comics Ace as of April 2022.

Anime
An anime adaptation of the manga was announced on April 20, 2021. It was later confirmed to be a television series produced by Encourage Films and directed by Fumitoshi Oizaki, with Reiko Yoshida overseeing the series' scripts, Sakae Shibuya designing the characters and serving as chief animation director, and Ren Takada composing the music. It aired from April 6 to June 22, 2022, on AT-X and other networks. The opening theme song is "Sumire" by Maaya Sakamoto, while the ending theme song is "Koko ni Aru Yakusoku" by the special unit Deaimon. Crunchyroll has licensed the series.

Episode list

See also
Tengai Retrogical – Another manga series by the same author

Notes

References

External links
Deaimon at Young Ace 

2022 anime television series debuts
Anime series based on manga
Confectionery in fiction
Crunchyroll anime
Encourage Films
Iyashikei anime and manga
Kadokawa Dwango franchises
Kadokawa Shoten manga
Medialink
Seinen manga
Slice of life anime and manga